Alexis Creek is an unincorporated community in the Chilcotin District of the western Central Interior of the Canadian province of British Columbia, on Highway 20 between Williams Lake and Bella Coola. The creek is named, like the adjacent lake of the same name, for a colonial-era chief of the Tsilhqot'in people, Alexis, who figured in the story of the Chilcotin War of 1864 (though as a non-combatant).

The small unincorporated settlement of Alexis Creek has the following services: British Columbia Forestry Service (now BC Ministry of Forests, Lands, Natural Resources Operations, and Rural Development) field office, the Alexis Creek School (elementary grades), a highways maintenance yard, a small detachment of the Royal Canadian Mounted Police, the Happy Eater restaurant, the Doodle Bugs café, Doug's Repair (automotive servicing, parts, tires, and supplies), a provincial medical clinic (operated by Interior Health), the Alexis Creek General Store (groceries, sundries, mailboxes), and a dispatch station of the British Columbia Ambulance Service. 
  
Since the early 2000s, Alexis Creek has also been home to the Ravens Unit Crew, originally an all-first-nations wildland fire crew.  All of the crew members live in the community seasonally and comprise the only permanently stationed, professional fire crew west of the Fraser River.

Climate

See also
Alexis Creek First Nation (Chilanko Forks)
Tl'etinqox-t'in Government Office (located in Alexis Creek)

References

External links
britishcolumbia.com article on Alexis Creek

Indian reserves in British Columbia
Unincorporated settlements in British Columbia
Designated places in British Columbia
Populated places in the Chilcotin
Tsilhqot'in communities